Major Mapleleaf is the name of two fictional superheroes appearing in American comic books published by Marvel Comics, primarily in the series Alpha Flight. Both characters were created by writer Scott Lobdell.

Major Mapleleaf (Louis Sadler) 

Louis Sadler is the name of the first Major Mapleleaf. He first appeared in Alpha Flight #106.

Fictional character biography 
Louis Sadler is a Canadian superhero during World War II and the occasional ally of the Invaders in their battles against Hitler and the Nazis. He gains his powers through an unrevealed process which appears to have affected his aging process. After the war, he goes underground with his crime-fighting and eventually reveals his public identity in 1963 so that he can devote time to raising his son, Michael, his proudest achievement. After Michael's death from AIDS, Sadler sinks into a depression. Later, when the news is making a cause celebre out of a baby with HIV, he goes on a rampage, believing society did not care about Michael's fate due to his being gay. He is stopped by Northstar of Alpha Flight.

Major Mapleleaf (Lou Sadler Jr.) 

Louis Sadler Jr., the younger son of the original Major Mapleleaf, assumes the mantle of Major Mapleleaf. Lou first appears in Alpha Flight vol. 3 #1.

Fictional character biography 
Louis "Lou" Sadler Jr. is a normal human with no superpowers who rides a super-powered horse named Thunder.

Bearing the rank of staff sergeant in the Royal Canadian Mounted Police, Sadler takes the codename Major Mapleleaf to honour his father. Lou was reportedly beaten by his father, who blamed him for the death of his mother. Lou, who speaks very positively of his father, denies the abuse.

Sadler is recruited by Sasquatch as one of the new members of the Alpha Flight team when the original team is kidnapped by aliens.

Along with Guardian, both incarnations of Puck, Vindicator, and Shaman, Major Mapleleaf is among the Alpha Flight members killed by the Collective.

References

External links 
AlphaFlight.net Alphanex Entry on Major Mapleleaf I
AlphaFlight.net Alphanex Entry on Major Mapleleaf II

Uncannxmen.net Character Profile on Major Mapleleaf II

Fictional staff sergeants
Fictional Royal Canadian Mounted Police officers
Canadian superheroes
Comics set in Canada
Canadian-themed superheroes
Marvel Comics superheroes
Marvel Comics military personnel
Marvel Comics mutates
Marvel Comics characters with superhuman strength
Characters created by Clayton Henry
Characters created by Scott Lobdell
Comics characters introduced in 1992
Comics characters introduced in 2004